Abdul Rahim Ghafoorzai (c.194721 August 1997) was a politician and diplomat of Afghanistan. He was an ethnic Pashtun, a member of the Barakzai Mohammadzai tribe. 

During the 1970s he entered the Afghan foreign service. He was sent to the United States to represent the political administration supported by the Soviet Union. As the ambassador to the United Nations, Ghafoorzai thought it his duty to call on global partners to denounce the Soviet invasion in 1979. From then until 1992, he worked to encourage international opposition to the regime that the Soviets had set up in Afghanistan. 

When the communist government fell in 1992, Ghafoorzai acted as an intermediary to unite the contending factions. He worked in the United Nations until 1995 and then became deputy foreign minister. He became foreign minister in July 1996. 

In September 1996 the government troops withdrew from Kabul and the Taliban captured Afghanistan's capital, Kabul. The international community, other than Pakistan, the United Arab Emirates and Saudi Arabia, did not recognize the Taliban as Afghanistan's legitimate government. The new Islamic State of Afghanistan government established the new cabinet in Mazar e Sharif in the north of Afghanistan, meanwhile the Afghanistan embassies and the permanent mission of Afghanistan to the United Nations were in control of Islamic State of Afghanistan as the legitimate representative of Afghanistan. Ghafoorzai continued as Afghanistan's foreign minister until 11 August 1997. 

Just ten days before his death, he was appointed prime minister of the Islamic State of Afghanistan government. He was killed in a plane crash in Bamyan Province where he was going to negotiate with allies to form his cabinet.

References 

 Afghanistan Online - Abdul Ghafoorzai

1997 deaths
Prime Ministers of Afghanistan
Pashtun people
State leaders killed in aviation accidents or incidents
1947 births
Foreign ministers of Afghanistan